The Darmstadt University of Applied Sciences, also known as h_da, is a University of Applied Sciences located in Darmstadt, Germany.

h_da is part of the IT cluster Rhine-Main-Neckar, the "Silicon Valley of Germany" and ATHENE, the largest research institute for IT security in Europe.

History 
The roots of University of Applied Sciences Darmstadt go back to 1876 along with Technische Universität Darmstadt (the first electrical engineering chair and inventions fame), when both these Universities were a single, integrated entity from the early 1930s. Over the years a need for an independent educational institution focussed on industry-oriented research was felt, and the University of Applied Sciences emerged as a spun-off, separate institution for industry-oriented research in 1971. It is the largest University of Applied Sciences in Hesse (German: Hessen) with about 11,000 students.

In 1971 when Hochschule Darmstadt was established, other regions of the Hesse also felt the need of such industry based educational institutions. In later years a large number of Hochschule were established all over Germany. As a result of this, today the German industry's engineering workforce is propelled by students of the Hochschule.

The Darmstadt University of Applied Sciences is one of the eight holders of the European university of technology, EUt+, with the Riga Technical University (Latvia), the Cyprus University of Technology (Cyprus), the Technical University of Sofia (Bulgaria), the Technological University Dublin (Ireland), the Polytechnic University of Cartagena (Spain), the University of Technology of Troyes (France) and the Technical University of Cluj-Napoca (Romania).

The European University of Technology alliance, EUt+, is the result of the cooperation of eight European partners who share in common the "Think Human First" vision towards a human-centred approach to technology and the ambition to establish a new type of institution on a confederal basis. Through EUt+, the partners are committed to creating a sustainable future for students and learners in European countries, for the staff of each of the institutions and for the territories and regions where each campus is anchored.

Campus
The Main campus of the Hochschule Darmstadt lies at the Haardtring office, but, the campus is evenly distributed all across the city of Darmstadt at different locations. A cluster of Old and Modern university buildings are visible across the city of Darmstadt. 
The media campus is in Dieburg.

Departments 

 Architecture
 Chemical Technology
 Civil Engineering
 Computer Science
 Design
 Media
 Economics
 Electrical Engineering and Information Technology
 Mathematics and Science
 Mechanical Engineering
 Plastics engineering
 Social and Cultural Studies
 Social Education
 Mechatronics

Reputation and Rankings 
Hochschule Darmstadt is a well-reputed institute to businesses in the German industry. It has consistently ranked very high on the DAAD ranking closely rivaled by Hochschule Karlsruhe. Maintaining its reputation in the specializations of Microelectronics and Robotics, Hochschule Darmstadt has contributed to some major industrial developments in Germany, including REIS and Mitsubishi Robot modules.

Research
Incorporated close ties with 

Max Planck Society
EUA European University Association

Institutes 
 Institute of Communication and Media (ikum) 
 Institute of Local Economics and Environmental Planning

See also 

 Education in Germany
 List of universities in Germany

References 

  DAAD information on Hochschule and Fachhochschule
  ranking

External links 
  

University of Applied Sciences
Universities of Applied Sciences in Germany
Universities and colleges in Hesse